The GNF2 2009–10 was the 48th edition of the Botola 2. For this season, the competition was expanded to 19 teams as 3 teams instead of the usual two were promoed from the 2008–09 GNFA 1 season. The season commenced on 23 July 2008 and concluded on 31 May 2009. JSK Chabab Kasba Tadla were crowned as champions of the Botola 2 for the 2009–10 season resulting in two successive promotions for the club following the promotion to the Botola 2 in the previous season. Chabab Rif Hoceima were also promoted to the 2010–11 Botola after finishing runners-up.

Team movement

Teams relegated from 2008–09 Botola
Mouloudia d'Oujda
Chabab Mohammédia

Teams promoted to 2009–10 Botola
FUS Rabat
Widad Fez

Teams relegated to 2009–10 GNFA 1 
Olympique Marrakech
CWW Cascablanca

Teams promoted from 2008–09 GNFA 1 
JSK Chabab Kasba Tadla
Raja Al Hoceima
Chabab Atlas Khénifra

Competing clubs 

 Chabab Houara
 TAS Casablanca
 Chabab Rif Hoceima
 Raja Al Hoceima
 Racing Cascablanca
 Ittihad Tanger
 Youssoufia Berrechid
 Union de Mohammédia
 Chabab Mohammédia
 Stade Moracain Rabat
 Renaissance de Settat
 Mouloudia d'Oujda
 USK Sidi Kacem
 Rachad Bernoussi Cascablanca
 Ittihad Riadi Fkih Ben Salah
 US Témara
 CODM de Meknès
 JSK Chabab Kasba Tadla
 Chabab Atlas Khénifra

Table

See also 
 2009–10 Botola

External links 
 Soccerway.com Botola2 Webpage

GNF 2 seasons
Moro
2009–10 in Moroccan football